Shayla LaVeaux (born December 27, 1969) is an American pornographic actress and exotic dancer.

Early life
LaVeaux was born in Golden, Colorado. She graduated from Wheat Ridge High School.

Career
At 18 years old, LaVeaux began stripping at Shotgun Willie's, a topless bar in Glendale, Colorado. She later began dancing at bachelor parties. She started modeling in men's magazines, such as Playboy, Penthouse, and Hustler, in order to build her brand. She began performing in adult films in 1992. Her first scene was with her friend Alexis DeVell, who she had accompanied to the shoot with initially no intention of performing in the scene, but she was asked if she wanted to replace another performer who didn't show up for work. She was a contract performer for director Paul Norman in 1993. She was once under a one-year contract with the studio VCA Pictures as well. LaVeaux has also done voice acting for hentai cartoons.

Awards
1994 Adam Film World Award – New Starlet
1994 AVN Award – Best New Starlet
1994 XRCO Award – New Starlet
1997 AVN Award – Most Outrageous Sex Scene – Shock (with T. T. Boy & Vince Vouyer)
 2001 AVN Hall of Fame
 2008 XRCO Hall of Fame

References

External links 

 
 
 
 

1969 births
American female erotic dancers
American erotic dancers
American pornographic film actresses
Living people
People from Golden, Colorado
Pornographic film actors from Colorado
21st-century American women